Collores may refer to:

 Collores, Humacao, Puerto Rico, a barrio in Puerto Rico
 Collores, Jayuya, Puerto Rico, a barrio in Puerto Rico
 Collores, Juana Díaz, Puerto Rico, a barrio in Puerto Rico
 Collores, Las Piedras, Puerto Rico, a barrio in Puerto Rico
 Collores, Orocovis, Puerto Rico, a barrio in Puerto Rico
 Collores, Yauco, Puerto Rico, a barrio in Puerto Rico